St Andrew's, Earlsfield, is an Anglican church at 571 Garratt Lane, Earlsfield, London.

It was built in 1889–90, and the architect was Edward William Mountford. It is a Grade II listed building since 2000.

References

19th-century Church of England church buildings
Earlsfield
Churches completed in 1890
Earlsfield
Earlsfield